The Dragon Republic is a grimdark fantasy novel written by R. F. Kuang and was published by HarperCollins. The book was published on August 6, 2019, as a sequel to The Poppy War.

Background 
The previous book ended with the invasion of Rin's homeland. The book details Rin's experiences with opium addiction and her intentions to murder the Empress. However, Rin now has the power of the Phoenix and is the commander of the Cike. Rin is captured by Yin Vaisra, the Dragon Warlord, who intends to conquer Nikan. The book was published on August 6, 2019. Racquel Nassor suggested content warnings in Book Riot for anyone intending to read the book for "Ableism, Addiction, Emotional Abuse, Physical Abuse, Animal Death, Racism, Sexual Assault, Suicide."

Reception 
Kristi Chadwick wrote in Library Journal that the book was a "stunning sequel to The Poppy War." Lucy Lockley wrote in Booklist that the author's "descriptive storytelling reveals the grueling psychological and material cost of war." Jason Kehe wrote in Wired Magazine that the book was "refreshing" and "shocking." Kalyani Saxena wrote in NPR that the book "might just be my favorite piece of fantasy of all time." Frannie Jackson wrote in Paste Magazine that the book has "cemented [Kuang's] status as a fantasy titan." Cate Matthews wrote in Time Magazine that the book has further established Kuang as "one of contemporary fantasy's most promising writers." Publishers Weekly called the book "an enthralling military fantasy brimming with betrayal and bloodshed."

Awards

Translations 
The Poppy War has been translated into a number languages, in addition to its original English.

Adaption 
The Poppy War Series was optioned for a television adaption by Starlight Media and SA Inc, and was being packaged by Allen Fischer.

References 

2019 American novels
Dark fantasy novels
HarperCollins books
Books by R.F. Kuang